Breda machine gun can refer one of several weapons made by the Italian Breda company:

Breda-SAFAT machine gun - used in aircraft
Breda 38 - used in vehicles
Breda 30 - light machine gun
Breda M37 - heavy machine gun